The Gandhidham–Kandla Port section belongs to the Western Railway of Kutch district in Gujarat state.

History
The railway was financed by the Maharao Khengarji Bawa of Kutch, and the initial section to Anjar was opened in 1905. 
An extension from Anjar to the state capital of Bhuj was later made and lines opened in 1908. 15 miles from Anjar to Kandla was opened in 1930. Cutch State Railway was merged into the Western Railway on 5 November 1951.

Route
Gandhidham–Kandla Port section connects Kandla Port. This line generally used to transport freight to and from Kandla Port.

References

5 ft 6 in gauge railways in India
Railway lines in Gujarat
Transport in Kutch district

1930 establishments in India
Transport in Gandhidham
Railway lines opened in 1930